Ansar al-Sharia or Ansar al-Shariah is a name used by a collection of radical or militant Islamist groups or militias, in at least eight countries. While they share names and ideology, they lack a unified command structure.

Ansar al-Sharia (Yemen)
Ansarul Sharia Pakistan
Ansar al-Sharia (Libya)
Ansar al-Sharia (Derna, Libya)
Ansar al-Sharia (Tunisia)
Ansar al-Sharia (Mali)
Ansar al-Sharia (Egypt)
Ansar al-Sharia (Mauritania)
Syria
Ansar al-Sharia (Syria) (reportedly defunct in 2015, officially self-disbanded 2017.05.27)

See also
al-Qaeda in the Arabian Peninsula, a militant Islamist organization, primarily active in Yemen and Saudi Arabia